The New Town Hall is a city hall in Hanover, Germany. It opened on 20 June 1913 after construction lasting 12 years.

History
Costing 10 million Marks, the New Town Hall was erected on 6026 beech piles by architects Hermann Eggert and Gustav Halmhuber. "Ten million Marks, Your Majesty – and all paid for in cash", the City Director, is claimed to have announced when the New Town Hall was opened in the presence of Emperor Wilhelm II. In honour of Tramm the square in front of the building is named Trammplatz. 

, the New Town Hall is still "the residence of the Mayor and CEO, the head of the municipal administration."

Damaged during bombing raids on the inner city of Hanover in World War II, the German state of Lower Saxony was proclaimed in 1946 in the  hall of the New Town Hall.

The dome's lift is unique in the world in that its arched course follows the parabolic shape of the dome. It is often incorrectly described as a sloping lift up the dome and compared with the lifts in the Eiffel Tower, which actually only travel diagonally, without changing their angle of inclination. The lift climbs the  shaft at an angle of up to 17° to the gallery of the dome, where the Harz mountain range can be seen when visibility is good. During the trip, the two weight-bearing cables wind up on three double rolls in the wall of the shaft.

The lift was erected in 1913. The lift cage travelled in steam-bent oaken tracks. Because of the weather, the original lift was not usable in the colder half of the year. There is a spiral staircase, which leads from the lift exit to the observation level. In 2005, over 90,000 people visited the tower of the New Town Hall. A new lift was installed in winter of 2007–08. The last trip of the old lift took place with Lord Mayor Stephan Weil on November 4, 2007. On that weekend, 1200 guests took the last opportunity to ride in the old lift.

There are four city models of Hanover in the ground floor of the New Town Hall. They vividly portray the development of the city.

Literature

View

References

Further reading

External links

 Information of the city of Hanover about the New City Hall in German
 Webcam with a view of the New City Hall
 3D model in GoogleEarth 4
 New City Hall city panorama - Interactive 360° panorama with New City Hall dome and panoramic view

Buildings and structures in Hanover
City and town halls in Germany
1913 establishments in Germany
Government buildings completed in 1913
Tourist attractions in Hanover
Government buildings with domes
Hermann Eggert buildings